Sree Sarada Ashram Balika Bidayalaya is a girls' school under the Sarada Ashram organization. It is situated in New Alipore, India. The school was established in 1959. The Ashram has its origin away back in 1944.

About School
The school is up to class 12. There three divisions - the morning division is for the primary classes 1 to 4 and the Higher Secondary 11 and 12; the secondary division consists the rest. The medium of learning is both English and Bengali. 
  
Students are placed in four houses - Sarada, Nibedita, Sudhira and Christina.

See also
Education in India
List of schools in India
Education in West Bengal

References

External links
 Times of India article

Primary schools in West Bengal
High schools and secondary schools in West Bengal
Girls' schools in Kolkata
Educational institutions established in 1959
1959 establishments in West Bengal